Royal College of Engineering and Technology (RCET) is an engineering institution in Thrissur district, Kerala, India. RCET is managed by Royal Educational Society and Research Centre, affiliated to APJ Abdul Kalam Technological University and approved by All India Council for Technical Education (AICTE).

Departments
 Civil Engineering
 Computer Science and Engineering
 Electrical and Electronics Engineering
 Electronics and Communication Engineering
 Mechanical Engineering
 Applied Science and Humanities
 Physical Education

References

Engineering colleges in Thrissur district